The Wellington Range is a mountain range located in the southeast region of Tasmania, Australia. The range is mainly composed of dolerite and features evidence of past glaciation.

The Wellington Range is part of the Wellington Park Reserve.

Environment
The Wellington Range is home to over 500 unique species of flora, despite being mostly high alpine region.  The range forms part of the South-east Tasmania Important Bird Area, identified as such by BirdLife International because of its importance in the conservation of a range of woodland birds, especially the endangered swift parrot and forty-spotted pardalote.

See also

 List of highest mountains of Tasmania

References

Mountain ranges of Tasmania
Important Bird Areas of Tasmania
South East coast of Tasmania
Landmarks in Hobart
Geography of Hobart
Tourist attractions in Hobart
Mount Wellington (Tasmania)